Carmen Tanase (born  January 18, 1961) is a Romanian actress. After graduating The Drama and Film Institute from Bucharest, in 1984, she joined the company of "Vasile Alecsandri" National Theatre in Iaşi (between 1984-1990) and then moved back to the capital city of Romania. Since 1990, she is a member of the Odeon Theatre company from Bucharest. As a student, she played in Dostoevsky's The Possessed (a dramatization of the great Russian novel), in John Steinbeck's Sweet Thursday, in Butterflies, Butterflies by the Italian playwright Aldo Nicolaj (at The Very Small Theatre in Bucharest, having the legendary Romanian actress Olga Tudorache and Radu Duda, the would-be Prince of Hohenzollern-Veringen, as partners) etc. Following the fall of the Romanian communist regime, in 1989 (the end of Nicolae Ceauşescu's dictatorship), she also involved herself in the independent artistic movements that flourished after these events. She toured the world with Radu Duda, the two of them playing in A Report to an Academy, the adaptation of a short story by Franz Kafka, directed by Cristina Iovita (the play was produced by the first Romanian independent theatrical group formed after the 1989 Revolution).

Stage credits (selected)

Teatrelli, Bucharest

Diana in California Suite by Neil Simon, directed by Gelu Colceag

Comedy Theatre, Bucharest

Polina Andreevna in The Seagull by Anton Chekhov, directed by Claudiu Goga

Odeon Theatre, Bucharest

 Dr. Martha Livingstone in Agnes of God by John Pielmeier, directed by Marius Oltean
 The chief nurse in Veronika Decides To Die, adaptation by Gelu Colceag and George Banica after the homonymous novel by Paulo Coelho, directed by Gelu Colceag
 Colette Duduleanu in The Rattlers by Al. Kiritescu, directed by Alexandru Dabija
 Lora in Stars In The Morning Light by Alexandr Galin, directed by Gelu Colceag
 Paraschiva in Miss Nastasia by G.M. Zamfirescu, directed by Horea Popescu
 Pierette in The Gossip Ladies by Michel Tremblay, directed by Petre Bokor
 The old gipsy woman in At The Gipsy Women by Cristian Popescu, based on the short story by Mircea Eliade, directed by Alexander Hausvater
 …And They Put Handcuffs On The Flowers… by Fernando Arrabal, directed by Alexander Hausvater
 The Grin Opera by Dario Fo, directed by Dragos Galgotiu

National Theatre, Iasi
 Mona in A Nameless Star by Mihail Sebastian, directed by Nicoleta Toia
 She in The Boa's Strategy after A.P. Chekhov, directed by Nicoleta Toia
 Gittel in Two for the Seesaw by William Gibson, directed by Ion Manzatu
 Firuta in The Author Is In The Auditorium by Ion Baiesu, directed by Saul Taisler
 Zita in A Stormy Night by I.L. Caragiale, directed by Ovidiu Lazar
 Helen in Warsaw Melody by L. Zorin, directed by Ion Manzatu
 Ana in The Game Of Life And Death by Horia Lovinescu, directed by Nicoleta Toia
 Mrs Gabor in Spring's Awakening by Frank Wedekind, directed by Cristina Iovita

Selected filmography
 May's Fever (short film), directed by Tudor Parhon, 2010
 State și Flacăra - Vacanță la Nisa, directed by Iura Luncasu, 2010
 State de Romania - student la Sorbona, directed by Iura Luncasu, 2009
 Knot, directed by Alina Ciocarlie, 2007
 Tears Of Love, directed by Iura Luncasu, 2006
 Too Late, directed by Adi Sitaru, 2006
 Love Sick, directed by Tudor Giurgiu, 2006
 Dormir avec le diable, directed by Yves Boisset, 2001
 Une femme piégée, directed by Laurent Carceles, 2001
 Im Zeichen der Liebe, directed by Kathe Kratz, 1995
 Passion Mortelle, directed by Claude-Michel Rome, 1995
 Babe, Maa (Romanian dubbing), directed by Chris Noonan, 1995
 Dark Angel: The Ascent, directed by Linda Hassani, 1994
 È pericoloso sporgersi, directed by Nae Caranfil, 1994
 The Cathouse, directed by Andrei Blaier, 1993
 I'm Going Mad And I'm Sorry, directed by Ion Gostin, 1992
 The Dogs Way, directed by Laurentiu Damian, 1991
 The Culprit, directed by Alexa Visarion, 1991
 A Clod of Clay, directed by Nicolae Margineanu, 1989
 Misterele Bucurestilor, directed by Doru Nastase, 1983

Television credits
 Mara Anghel in Pariu cu viața, directed by Iura Luncașu, Alex Fotea and Alex Borundel, 2011 - 2013, and O nouă viață, directed by Alex Fotea and Mihai Brătilă, 2014.
 Flacara Potcovaru in Gipsy Heart, Regina, State de Romania, Mostenirea (TV series), directed by Iura Luncasu, Alexandru Fotea and Sebastian Voinea/ Larry Maronese; Iura Luncasu, Larry Maronese, Vladimir Anton; Larry Maronese, Mihai Bratila, Iura Luncasu, 2007-2008, 2008-2009, 2009–2010, 2010–2011.
 Zuzu in A Movie-like Romance (TV series), directed by Iura Luncasu and Bogdan Dumitrescu, 2006-2007
 Simona Varlam in Tears of Love (TV series), directed by Iura Luncasu and Bogdan Dumitrescu, 2005-2006

External links

teatrul-odeon.ro
 cinemagia.ro
Carmen Tănase videos on YouTube

Romanian stage actresses
Romanian film actresses
Actresses from Bucharest
1961 births
Living people
Romanian television actresses